Trīdeksnis (also known as trīdēkslis, trīdēksnis, strīdēkslis etc.) is a Latvian percussion instrument. It consists of a short wooden handle running through three increasing width tiers of flat horizontal discs, with small triangular metal rattles hanging off the edges of the disks. The trīdeksnis is used by shaking it like a rattle or hitting the handle against the palm, causing metal discs to jingle.

In NBC series Community, the trīdeksnis is played during a Latvian independence day parade inside a blanket fort in the episode "Conspiracy Theories and Interior Design".

References 

Latvian musical instruments
Idiophones